Catherine Tufariello (born 1963 in Ithaca, New York) is an American poet and former professor at Cornell University, the College of Charleston, and the University of Miami.

Biography
She graduated from University at Buffalo, and Cornell University with a PhD. 

She taught at Cornell University, the College of Charleston, and the University of Miami. Her work has appeared in The Hudson Review, Poetry, and Yale Italian Poetry (translations).

She lives in Indiana, where she and her husband teach at Valparaiso University, with their daughter.

Awards
 2006 Poets' Prize
 Booklist Editors' Choice recommendation
 Walt McDonald First Book Poetry Prize
 Los Angeles Times Book Prize Finalist
 Sewanee Writers' Conference, fellowship

Works
"Bête Noire", Umbrella Journal, Winter 2002
"SMALL GIRL IN A GIFT SHOP", Valparaiso Poetry Review

Anthologies

References

External links
"Author's website"
"SEEING INTO THE PREDICTABLE: AN INTERVIEW OF CATHERINE TUFARIELLO", Valparaiso Poetry Review

1963 births
Living people
College of Charleston faculty
Cornell University alumni
Cornell University faculty
University at Buffalo alumni
University of Miami faculty
American women poets
American writers of Italian descent
21st-century American poets
21st-century American women writers
Valparaiso University faculty
People from Ithaca, New York
Poets from New York (state)
American women academics